The Institute of Contemporary Chinese Studies is located at the University of Nottingham, England.  It is situated in Siyuan Building on the Jubilee Campus.  It is an interdisciplinary institute studying the commerce, culture, and society of China, and promoting links with that country.  It was officially opened on the 15 June 2000 by Ma Zhengang, the Chinese ambassador to the United Kingdom.

The Institute was awarded "School" status, and became School of Contemporary Chinese Studies From the 2007 academic year.

The School of Contemporary Chinese Studies at the University of Nottingham is located in Siyuan Building on the Jubilee Campus of the University of Nottingham. The school is headed by Professor Shujie Yao, a professor of economics and has research staff and students from a wide variety of disciplines as applied to the Chinese case, for example: culture and society; history; politics and the political economy; languages (Mandarin, Cantonese, Taiwanese and languages of ethnic minorities such as Hakka); business and management; economics and finance; media and education. The School has grown rapidly since inception and now caters for more than one thousand students at the University of Nottingham taking undergraduate degrees which include a Chinese Studies component or who are enrolled in one of the School's own 4 year MSci degree courses, such as Global Issues and Contemporary Chinese Studies. Three new Masters courses were launched by the School in 2011, which include Chinese Banking and Finance Markets, and Chinese Business and Management in addition to the already existing MA in Contemporary Chinese Studies.

The building in which the School is located (International House) also houses the University of Nottingham's China Policy Institute (CPI) and Confucius Institute on the floors below its administrative offices. The CPI is the UK's largest China policy think tank providing in-house policy advice on behalf of European and US policymakers on China. The CPI publishes its own blog with entries contributed by lecturing staff and PhD candidates. The University of Nottingham Confucius Institute runs Mandarin classes in the evenings for academics, students and the public with an interest in learning the mainland Chinese language and simplified script.

In order to accommodate the thriving nature of the School of Contemporary Chinese Studies, a new building is currently being erected at the Jubilee Campus for use in 2012 academic year.

External links
Institute of Contemporary Chinese Studies
 

University of Nottingham